"A still small voice" is a phrase describing a manifestation of God to Elijah from 1 Kings 19:12.

Still Small Voice or variants may refer to:

Books
A Still Small Voice, a 2000 novel by John Reed
After the Fire, A Still Small Voice, a 2009 novel by author Evie Wyld 2009
The Still, Small Voice of Trumpets, a 1968 work by Lloyd Biggle Jr.

Film and TV
Still Small Voices , a 2007 ghost film
"That Still Small Voice", an episode of the American television series Once Upon a Time
"A Still Small Voice", an episode of British television series Oh, Brother!
"A Still Small Voice", an episode of French television series Versailles

Music
Still Small Voice (album), a 2003 album by Paul Jackson Jr.
, a Japanese band featured on manga series Kodocha
"O still, small voice of calm", phrase in the hymn Dear Lord and Father of Mankind
 "Still Small Voice", from Stonehill's  albums Celebrate this Hearbeat and Love Beyond Reason 
" Still Small Voice", song by the Strawbs (Cousins) from Hero and Heroine 
 "A Still Small Voice", song by Perry Como (Ben Weisman and lyrics by Al Stillman) from When You Come to the End of the Day